Kargilik, sometimes also spelt Karghilik, may refer to:

 Kargilik County (Yecheng) in southern Kashgar Prefecture, Xinjiang Uighur Autonomous Region, China
 Kargilik Town (Yecheng), a city in southern Kashgar Prefecture, Xinjiang Uighur Autonomous Region, China

See also 
 Kargalik (disambiguation)
 Kargili (disambiguation)